Eveliina Tammenlaakso (born 27 May 1995), better known as simply Evelina, is a Finnish singer and songwriter. She is signed to the Universal Music Group label M-Eazy Music.

Life and career
Evelina was born as Eveliina Tammenlaakso in Turku. She first began her music career in 2011 as a contestant in season one of The Voice of Finland, where she was a member of Elastinen's team. She was eliminated during the live shows.

In 2015, Evelina signed a record deal with the Universal Music Group label M-Eazy Music and released her debut double single "Rakkaudesta lajiin"/"Vuoristorataa" in May 2015. She released her breakthrough single later in the year called "Honey", featuring Finnish rapper Mikael Gabriel and penned with American songwriter Hope Raney. The song became a hit in Finland, and reached number-one on the Finnish singles chart. The following year she also released the singles "Sireenit" and "Sushi", which also became top ten hits. Her debut album 24K sold platinum before being released in 2016.

In 2018, Evelina won the Female Soloist of the Year award in Emma-gaala.

Discography

Albums

EPs

Singles

Featured

References

External links
 
 
 
 
 

1995 births
21st-century Finnish women singers
Finnish hip hop musicians
Finnish pop singers
Living people
Musicians from Turku
The Voice (franchise) contestants
Universal Music Group artists